Magtu (also Romanized as Magtūʿ; also known as Maktū‘ and Maqţū‘) is a village in Soveyseh Rural District, in the Soveyseh District of Karun County, Khuzestan Province, Iran. At the 2006 census, its population was 72, in 14 families.

References 

Populated places in Karun County